John Wilson Clark (born 9 July 1944) is a New Zealand rower.

Clark was born in 1944 in Wellington, New Zealand. He was a member of Wellington Rowing Club and the Tauranga Rowing Club. He represented New Zealand at the 1972 Summer Olympics. He is listed as New Zealand Olympian athlete number 265 by the New Zealand Olympic Committee.

References

1944 births
Living people
New Zealand male rowers
Rowers at the 1972 Summer Olympics
Olympic rowers of New Zealand
Rowers from Wellington City